Ricardo Ferreira da Silva Kubitski, or simply Ricardinho (born 9 September 1984), is a Brazilian professional football left back.

Club career

In Brazil
Born in Curitiba, Ricardinho started his career in Coritiba where he played from youth teams to the first team and established himself in the starting eleven. He played over 100 games in Coritiba, winning two Campeonato Paranaense in the process. In 2009, he moved to Europe and Sweden for Malmö FF.

Malmö FF

At Malmö FF Ricardinho was first-choice left back. At the beginning of the 2010 season he broke his foot and missed the first five games of the season. After recovery he came back and reclaimed his place in the starting eleven for the remainder of the league-winning season. For the 2011 season he was the only player of the club to play all 30 league matches. He also played for the club in the qualifying stages to the 2011–12 UEFA Champions League and in the group stage of the 2011–12 UEFA Europa League. During the 2011 season Ricardinho signed a new contract to the end of the 2014 season.

Ricardinho played in 28 of 30 matches for Malmö FF during the 2012 season and scored 2 league goals. The following season the club won the league title and  Ricardinho played 27 league matches. He also played in all of the club's six matches in the qualifying stages of the 2013–14 UEFA Europa League. In his last season at Malmö FF he played in 23 league fixtures as well as in 10 matches for the club's campaign in the 2014–15 UEFA Champions League. On 13 December 2014 Ricardinho announced that he would not renew his contract with the club.

Gabala
On 16 February 2015, Ricardinho signed a contract with Gabala FK in the Azerbaijan Premier League till the end of the 2014–15 season.

Oxford United
On 3 August 2017, Ricardinho signed for English League One side Oxford United on a one-year deal, with the option of a further year. He scored his first goal for the club on 7 October, the second of three unanswered goals against AFC Wimbledon in a League One fixture at the Kassam Stadium. He was voted the Players' Player of the Year at the end of the 2017–18 season. Ricardinho was, and remains, an immensely popular, almost cult-like player among Oxford fans, who particularly revered his high work rate and seemingly perennial smile. His legacy was underlined when, in January 2021, he was voted the club's 21st-most popular player of the 2010s, despite having only played for the Yellows for a single season.

Twente
After turning down a contract extension with Oxford, Ricardindo signed for Dutch side FC Twente on a free transfer on 27 July 2018.

International career
Ricardinho is eligible for international play for both Brazil and Sweden. He has never been capped for Brazil and in October 2014 he became a Swedish citizen after living in the country for five years.

Career statistics

Club

Honours

Club
Coritiba
Campeonato Paranaense: 2003, 2004, 2008

Atlético Mineiro
Campeonato Mineiro: 2007

Malmö FF
Allsvenskan: 2010, 2013, 2014
Svenska Supercupen: 2013, 2014

Twente
Eerste Divisie: 2018–19

References

External links

 Ricardinho at Malmö FF 
 
 

1984 births
Living people
Footballers from Curitiba
Brazilian footballers
Association football defenders
Coritiba Foot Ball Club players
Clube Atlético Mineiro players
Malmö FF players
Gabala FC players
Oxford United F.C. players
FC Twente players
Campeonato Brasileiro Série A players
Campeonato Brasileiro Série B players
Allsvenskan players
Azerbaijan Premier League players
English Football League players
Eerste Divisie players
Brazilian expatriate footballers
Expatriate footballers in Sweden
Expatriate footballers in Azerbaijan
Expatriate footballers in England
Expatriate footballers in the Netherlands
Brazilian expatriate sportspeople in Sweden
Brazilian expatriate sportspeople in Azerbaijan
Brazilian expatriate sportspeople in England
Brazilian expatriate sportspeople in the Netherlands